Brian Horgan (born 1976) is an Irish hurler who played as a right wing-back for the Tipperary senior hurling team.

Born in Dundrum, County Tipperary, Horgan first arrived on the inter-county scene at the age of seventeen when he first linked up with the Tipperary minor teams as a dual player, before later joining the under-21 hurling team. He joined the senior team for the 1998 championship. Horgan went on to play a bit part for Tipperary over the next few years, and won one National Hurling League medal.

At club level Horgan won numerous divisional medals in both hurling and Gaelic football with Knockavilla–Donaskeigh Kickhams.

Throughout his career Horgan made just four championship appearances.  His inter-county career came to an end following the conclusion of the 2003 championship.

In retirement from playing, Horgan became involved in team management and coaching. He was an All-Ireland-winning selector with the Tipperary minor team in 2012.  Horgan was expected to be appointed as a selector to the Kerry senior hurling team in January 2014.

Honours

Player

Knockavilla–Donaskeigh Kickhams
West Tipperary Senior Hurling Championship (3): 1997, 1999, 2006 (c)
West Tipperary Senior Football Championship (1): 1998
Tipperary Intermediate Football Championship (1): 2002
West Tipperary Intermediate Football Championship (3): 1993, 2002, 2004, 2005
Tipperary Junior Football Championship (1): 2009
Tipperary Under-21 Hurling Championship (1): 1994
West Tipperary Under-21 Hurling Championship (2): 1994, 1995
West Tipperary Minor Hurling Championship (2): 1993, 1994

Tipperary
National Hurling League (1): 1999
All-Ireland Under-21 Hurling Championship (1): 1995 (c)
Munster Under-21 Hurling Championship (1): 1995 (c)
Munster Minor Hurling Championship (1): 1993

Selector

Tipperary
All-Ireland Minor Hurling Championship (1): 2012
Munster Minor Hurling Championship (1): 2012

References

1976 births
Living people
Knockavilla-Donaskeigh Kickhams hurlers
Knockavilla-Donaskeigh Kickhams Gaelic footballers
Tipperary inter-county hurlers
Tipperary inter-county Gaelic footballers
Hurling selectors